Simon Sechter (11 October 1788 – 10 September 1867) was an Austrian music theorist, teacher, organist, conductor and composer. He was one of the most prolific composers who ever lived, although his music is largely forgotten and he is now mainly remembered as a strict music teacher, most notably of Anton Bruckner. He was a well respected music teacher during his life earning the praise of Beethoven, Schubert and Schumann.

Carl Christian Müller (18311914) compiled and adapted Sechter's Die richtige Folge der Grundharmonien as The Correct Order of Fundamental Harmonies: A Treatise on Fundamental Basses, and their Inversions and Substitutes (Wm. A. Pond, 1871; G. Schirmer, 1898).

Biography 
Sechter was born in Friedberg (Frymburk), Bohemia, then part of the Austrian Empire, and moved to Vienna in 1804, succeeding Jan Václav Voříšek as court organist there in 1824. In 1810 he began teaching piano and voice at an academy for blind students. In 1828 the ailing Franz Schubert had one counterpoint lesson with him. In 1851 Sechter was appointed professor of composition at the Vienna Conservatory. He died in poverty due to his involvement in a son-in-law's bankruptcy. He was succeeded at the Conservatory by Anton Bruckner, a former student whose teaching methods were based on Sechter's.

Teaching methods 
Others whom Sechter taught include Henri Vieuxtemps, Franz Lachner, Eduard Marxsen (who taught Johannes Brahms piano and counterpoint), Johann Nepomuk Fuchs, Gustav Nottebohm, Anton Door, Karl Umlauf, Béla Kéler, Nina Stollewerk, Sigismond Thalberg, Adolf von Henselt, Anton de Kontski, Kornelije Stanković and Theodor Döhler.

Sechter had strict teaching methods. For instance, he forbade Bruckner to write any original compositions while studying counterpoint with him. The scholar Robert Simpson believes that "Sechter unknowingly brought about Bruckner's originality by insisting that it be suppressed until it could no longer be contained." Sechter taught Bruckner by mail from 1855 to 1861 and considered Bruckner his most dedicated pupil. Upon Bruckner's graduation, Sechter wrote a fugue dedicated to his student.

In the three-volume treatise on the principles of composition, Die Grundsätze der musikalischen Komposition, Sechter wrote a seminal work that influenced many later theorists. Sechter's ideas are derived from Jean-Philippe Rameau's theories of the fundamental bass, always diatonic even when the surface is highly chromatic; music theory historians strongly associate Sechter with the Viennese conception of fundamental bass theory. Sechter was an advocate of just intonation over well-tempered tuning.

As composer 
Sechter was also a composer, and in that capacity he is mostly remembered for writing about 5,000 fugues (he tried to write at least one fugue every day), but he also wrote masses and oratorios. In addition he wrote five operas: Das Testament des Magiers (1842), Ezzeline, die unglückliche Gegangene aus Deli-Katesse (1843), Ali Hitsch-Hatsch (1844), Melusine (1851), and Des Müllers Ring (?). In 1823–24, he was one of the 51 composers who composed a variation on a waltz by Anton Diabelli for Vaterländischer Künstlerverein.

References 

1788 births
1867 deaths
19th-century Austrian people
19th-century classical composers
19th-century classical musicians
19th-century Czech people
19th-century keyboardists
19th-century Czech male musicians
19th-century organists
Austrian classical organists
Austrian Classical-period composers
Austrian conductors (music)
Austrian male classical composers
Austrian music educators
Austrian music theorists
Austrian opera composers
Austrian people of German Bohemian descent
Austrian Romantic composers
Czech classical organists
Czech Classical-period composers
Czech conductors (music)
Czech male classical composers
Czech music educators
Czech opera composers
Czech Romantic composers
German Bohemian people
Male conductors (music)
Male opera composers
Male classical organists
People from Český Krumlov District